Hoërskool Waterkloof (colloquially known as Klofies) is a public Afrikaans medium co-educational high school situated in the eastern suburbs of Pretoria in the Gauteng province of South Africa. It is one of the most expensive Afrikaans medium schools, the fee per child amounting to R 32,400 per annum (as of 2019). It has received the award for academic school of the year from the  Gauteng Department of Education (GDE) in 2004, 2008, 2009, 2010, 2011 and 2012. In 2018, it received the award for best academic school in Gauteng province, the ninth time since 2009. It claims a 100% matric pass rate for 30 consecutive years.

History 
The school formally opened on 9 January 1979 with 12 classrooms and 441 grade 8 and 9 pupils. The original school buildings were completed on 3 August 1979. By 6 August 1979, the school hall was complete and used for the first time. The first principal was H. Davin, hence the footpath to the administrative building was named "Davinweg". There were 11 suggestions for the school name among which "Hoërskool Hoogland", "Hoërskool Pretoria-Oos" and "Hoërskool op die Kruin". However, on 13 March 1979 it was  named as "Hoërskool Waterkloof", and the school motto, "Ons bou in geloof" (i.e. We build in faith), was formally accepted on 2 July.

In 1980, the first permanent principal was appointed, P. van der Merwe Martins, a member of the Afrikaner Broederbond who was previously a teacher in Volksrust. The school employed 12 teachers and 2 typists at this stage, and the first registered student was Riana Hattingh. When Martins received a promotion in 1988, he was replaced by F. van Dyk as the second principal. L. C. Becker was principal from 1991 till 2009, when the school lost control over its finances and the board stepped in. On 12 January 2011, Daan G. C. Potgieter was appointed as the fourth permanent principal. The principal since 1 December 2018 is Chris H. Denysschen, formerly principal of Hoërskool Ben Vorster in Tzaneen.

The school anthem was written by S. J. Pretorius and was accepted on 13 May 1979 and the official banner was handed over on 18 September 1979.

On 9 February 1980, the first grass and trees were planted by teachers, parents and pupils. The grandstand was completed in the same year and was named after the first principal, P. van der Merwe Martins. In May 1994, Waterkloof's hostel "Klofiesig" was opened.

On the cultural front, the English department made their full-length play "Romeo and Juliet". The first opera "Die Witperdherberg" was staged in 1984. In 1984 the name "Druppels"  was given to the new grade 8 learners. The name was proposed by Jurika Brand, a member of the Klofieraad (prefects). In 1985 Waterkloof yielded 15 Northern Transvaal Junior Choir and Orchestra pupils. In 1986, the school choir had their first public concert during the Applous'86 competition.

With the development of the sports grounds, where the B and C rugby fields currently are, they had to be reclaimed because it was a natural pan where waterbirds were found. The first inter-house athletics event took place on 6 March 1979 and participated in the D-bond during the inter-schools athletics event. The first rugby match was played in the same year against Hoërskool Menlopark. Ulinda Gresse scored the first goal for the first hockey team. The first hockey team won their first game against Lyttelton Manor High in 1980. In September 1992, Waterkloof first rugby team won the "Direkteurstrofee" for the first time. In 1995 Waterkloof had won the A-bond interhigh athletics for the tenth consecutive year.

Ballet was offered as a subject from 1997.

2000s
During 2003, local schools received police visits urging pupils to help fight crime. According to the testimony of Christoff Becker, son of Waterkloof's principal, L. Christo Becker, this served as inspiration for two coordinated attacks on loitering black men in Constantia Park and Moreleta Park during the evening of 1 December 2003. Becker and three pupils of the school, the "Waterkloof Four", displayed defiance and arrogance in court and received 12-year prison sentences for assault and murder. A fifth pupil was acquitted for testifying against them. Both Beckers believed that the trial and related incidents constituted a vindictive plot against the family.

In 2007, the school reported alleged incidents of sexual misconduct by its pupils to the police. Older boys would have sexually abused younger boys while on a rugby bus tour.

In 2008, the deputy headmaster Louis Dey (45) sued three of the school's pupils for an amount of R600,000 after an incident in 2006 where they circulated a manipulated picture of him and the principal, L. Christo Becker, which depicted them naked and engaged in a seemingly homosexual act. The three teenagers were ordered to pay R45,000 in damages for sending the image to hundreds of pupils via MMS and Bluetooth, an amount which Dey described as "shockingly inappropriate". Dey resigned his post in 2007 to assume the position of headmaster at another school when Waterkloof's pupils wouldn't stop giggling when they passed him on the school grounds. 

In 2009, following a forensic audit requested in December 2008, the governing body committee stepped in to manage the school after uncovering alleged financial irregularities spanning the years 2004 to 2008, which ran into millions of rand. The school principal, L. Christo Becker, and his deputy, André D. Eloff, resigned before they could be put on compulsory leave. Some irate parents claimed the money was used to bankroll the protracted legal battle to keep the principal's son Christoff out of prison, while the upmarket lifestyle of his deputy was also singled out. Money was allegedly channeled through a secret account to the Aviation Academy, from which Becker took "interest free loans". The governing body chaired by Lukas Coetsee requested an audit of the Aviation Academy and considered legal steps against it, but was informed that it was an independent entity with Becker as director, and consequently not obligated to answer to them. At their hearings both Becker and Eloff implicated the governing body in channeling their "additional salaries" through the Academy. Onno Ubbink, subsequent chairman of the governing body said they were "not in a position to comment" on the department's sacking of Becker, Eloff and Van der Merwe, their financial administrator. A teacher speaking on condition of anonymity alleged that the improprieties could be traced back to 1999 and earlier, and that many highly qualified staff had resigned in response to their employment conditions. The same source alleged that the school's many poor pupils were not lent support, but some parents were indeed sued for outstanding fees, who had to pay legal costs as well. Leon de Beer was assigned the role of acting headmaster, until Daan Potgieter replaced him in 2011.

2010s
Early 2017, a married male teacher who was appointed less than a year earlier had to quit the school after his alleged intimate encounter with a grade ten pupil came to light. The incident of 2 February 2017 allegedly occurred in a classroom and was brought to the attention of the governing body by the principal. Its chairman disputed that the act was caught on camera or that it occurred following a "sokkie".

In April 2018 a matric boy of Hoërskool Eldoraigne and his mother visited the school to ask a Waterkloof matric girl to the boy's prom dance. A scuffle ensued between the boy and two staff members outside and inside the headmaster's office. When "urgent" interdicts were obtained against the boy and his mother three months later, the school's office declined to comment.

In early 2019 the hostel was renamed Huis Kloofsig. The hostel also introduced a new "koshuisvader", Cobus van Dyk, who was the forwards coach of the SA Schools Rugby team.

2020s
On 11 March 2020 a hacker gained access to the school's Facebook and Instagram accounts and vented anger at conditions at the school, including a supposed drop in pass rate and the behaviour of teachers, pupils and parents. In a press release headmaster Chris H. Denysschen labelled the breach as a cyber crime, but his deputy, Cobus van Dyk, claimed that the school suffered no damage to its reputation.

In February 2021 a spokesperson for the Gauteng Education Department expressed his disappointment with the disregard for social distancing at the school, even after completing COVID-19 operating procedures and regulations training. In March a grade 11 learner neglected to inform the school that they had tested positive for COVID-19, and the school placed 100 learners in isolation at a pavilion for their break times and homework session. At other times these pupils claimed to have moved about freely, but this was denied by the school's office. By April several learners and headmaster Chris H. Denysschen had tested positive for COVID-19. Denysschen recovered after a stint in intensive care.

Headmasters 

The headmasters (up of 2022) were:
 H. Davin (19791980)
 P. van der Merwe Martins (19801988)
 F. van Dyk (19881991)
 L. Christo Becker (19912009)
 L. de Beer (acting headmaster, 20092010)
 Daan G. C. Potgieter (20112018)
 Chris H. Denysschen (2019)

Sport 

Sports practiced or coached at the school are:
 Athletics 
 Chess
 Cricket 
 Cross country 
 Equestrian
 Golf
 Hockey (boys & girls)  
 Mountain biking 
 Netball (girls)
 Rugby (boys)  
 Squash 
 Swimming
 Table tennis
 Tennis 
 Water polo

Notable alumni 
List of the final years of Hoërskool Waterkloof are in alphabetical order:

 Daantjie Badenhorst (1985) - quiz show champion, journalist and author
 Danie van Schalkwyk (1994) - South African professional rugby player
 Wikus van Heerden (1997) - South African professional rugby player
 Gary Botha (1999) - South Aftican professional rugby player
 Hennie Jacobs (1999) - South African actor and singer
 Roelof van der Merwe (2002) South African professional cricketer 
 Willem de Beer (2006) - South African sprinter
 Stefan Watermeyer (2006) - South African professional rugby player 
 Melinda Bam (2007) - Miss South Africa (2012)
 Hardus Viljoen (2007) - South African professional cricket player
 Pieter Malan (2007) - South African professional cricket player
 Marnus Schoeman (2008) - South African professional rugby player
 Francois Brummer (2008) - South African professional rugby player
 Francois de Klerk (2009) - South African professional rugby player, 2019 Rugby World Cup winner
 Andre Malan (2009) - South African professional cricket player
 Sean Robinson (2011) - South African professional rugby player
 Christiaan Bezuidenhout  (2012) - South African professional golfer. 
 Rohan Janse van Rensburg (2012) - South African professional rugby player 
 Zander Lombard (2013) - South African professional golfer.
 Janneman Malan (2014) - South African professional cricket player.
 Tinus de Beer (2014) - South African professional rugby player 
 Stedman Gans (2015)  - South African professional rugby player.
 Jordan Hermann (2019) - South African professional cricketer.

External links

References

Afrikaner culture in Pretoria
Schools in Gauteng
Afrikaans-language schools
Educational institutions established in 1979
1979 establishments in South Africa